MNS Pebane is a ship of the Mozambique Navy. Commissioned in 2013, she was formerly operated by the Spanish Navy,  [es:Clase Conejera].

References

Mozambique Navy